The following are the national records in track cycling in the Philippines, maintained by its national cycling federation, Integrated Cycling Federation of the Philippines.

Men

Women

References

Philippines
records
track cycling